I'm Not a Gun is an American post-rock and electronica musical duo by John Tejada and Takeshi Nishimoto, formed in 2000.

Background 
Tejada and Nishimoto met in 1998 and discovered that they took inspiration from the same musicians. Shortly afterward, they held several recording sessions and eventually released multiple albums on the City Centre Offices imprint.

Their music has been remixed by several artists, including Dntel, Ulrich Schnauss, and Polar. The duo's music has been compared to that of the Chicago-based post-rock group, Tortoise.

Their name comes from the animated feature film The Iron Giant.

Discography

Albums 
Everything at Once (2003, City Centre Offices)
Our Lives on Wednesdays (2004, City Centre Offices)
We Think as Instruments (2006, City Centre Offices)
Mirror (2008, Palette Recordings)
Solace (2010, City Centre Offices)

EPs 
 Make Sense and Loose Remixes (2003, City Centre Offices)
 Sundays Will Never Change Remixes (2005, City Centre Offices)

References

External links 

I'm Not a Gun at Discogs

American electronic music groups